The UP Pulse is a German single-place paraglider that was designed and produced by UP Europe of Kochel am See. Introduced in 2000, production ended in 2003.

Design and development
The Pulse was designed as a beginner's glider for flight training.

Unlike other designs by the company, the Pulse only had one generation of models. The models are each named for their relative size.

The Pulse's sail was made from Porsher Marine New Skytex and its lines were fabricated from Cousin Trestec Super Aramid.

Variants
Pulse S
Small-sized model for lighter pilots. The glider model is Deutscher Hängegleiterverband e.V. (DHV) 1 certified.
Pulse M
Mid-sized model for medium-weight pilots. The glider model is DHV 1 certified.
Pulse L
Large-sized model for heavier pilots. The glider model is DHV 1 certified.

Specifications (Pulse M)

References

Pulse
Paragliders